Amirul Islam is a Bangladeshi film lyricist and actor. He won Bangladesh National Film Award for Best Lyrics for the film Bapjaner Bioscope (2015).

Filmography

As a film lyricist
 Bapjaner Bioscope - 2015

As a film actor
 Helener Chokhe Bangladesh -
 Princh of Bengal -
 Lalon -
 Kanna -
 Bapjaner Bioscope - 2015
 Nodijon - 2015
 Sonadip -

As a drama actor

Awards and nominations
National Film Awards

References

External links
 
 

Living people
Year of birth missing (living people)
Bangladeshi lyricists
Best Lyricist National Film Award (Bangladesh) winners
People from Kushtia District
People from Khulna
Bangladeshi actors